Kalyani Dhokarikar (Devanagari: कल्याणि धोकरिकर; born 9 May 1971, previous married name Kalyani Umbrani) is an Indian former cricketer who played as an all-rounder, batting right-handed and bowling right-arm medium-fast. She appeared in one Test and eight One Day Internationals for India between 1995 and 2000. She played domestic cricket for Maharashtra.

References

External links
 
 

1971 births
Living people
Cricketers from Nagpur
Indian women cricketers
India women Test cricketers
India women One Day International cricketers
Maharashtra women cricketers